Scrobipalpa flavimaculata is a moth in the family Gelechiidae. It was described by Oleksiy V. Bidzilya and Hou-Hun Li in 2010. It is found in Qinghai, China.

The forewings are yellowish white, with two diffused yellow spots at the base of the cell and a prolonged yellow spot at the corner of the cell, as well as brown scales along the costal margin. The hindwings are light grey. Adults are on wing in late July.

Etymology
The species name refers to the yellow spots on forewings and is derived from Latin flavus (meaning yellow) and maculatus (meaning spot).

References

Scrobipalpa
Moths described in 2010